Jonathan Aldair Araúz (born August 3, 1998), nicknamed "The Ooze", is a Panamanian professional baseball shortstop and second baseman in the New York Mets organization. He has previously played in Major League Baseball (MLB) for the Boston Red Sox and the Baltimore Orioles.

Playing career

Philadelphia Phillies
Araúz signed with the Philadelphia Phillies as an international free agent on August 7, 2014. He played for the GCL Phillies in 2015, hitting .254/.309/.370/.679 with 2 home runs and 18 RBI.

Houston Astros
On December 12, 2015, the Phillies traded Araúz and Ken Giles to the Houston Astros in exchange for Brett Oberholtzer, Harold Araúz, Mark Appel, Tom Eshelman, and Vince Velasquez. 

Araúz played for the Greeneville Astros in 2016, hitting .249/.323/.338/.661 with 2 home runs and 18 RBI. Araúz was suspended for 50 games at the beginning of the 2017 season, after testing positive for methamphetamine. He split the 2017 season between the Tri City ValleyCats and the Quad Cities River Bandits, hitting a combined .242/.336/.319/.655 with 1 home run and 15 RBI. He split the 2018 season between Ouad Cities and the Buies Creek Astros, hitting a combined .229/.305/.373/.678 with 8 home runs and 47 RBI. Araúz split the 2019 season between the Fayetteville Woodpeckers and the Corpus Christi Hooks, combining to hit .249/.319/.388/.707 with 11 home runs and 55 RBI.

Boston Red Sox
On December 12, 2019, Araúz was selected by the Boston Red Sox in the 2019 Rule 5 draft. On July 24, 2020, he made his MLB debut with the Red Sox in the team's first game of the  season, batting as a pinch hitter against the Baltimore Orioles. He made his first MLB start on July 30, against the New York Mets, and collected his first MLB hit on August 10, against the Tampa Bay Rays. Overall with the 2020 Red Sox, Araúz batted .250 with one home run and nine RBIs in 25 games. After the 2020 season, he played for Panama in the 2021 Caribbean Series, batting .269 in six games.

Araúz began the 2021 season in Triple-A, with the Worcester Red Sox. He was called up to Boston during May, July, and August. On September 10, Araúz was placed on the COVID-related injured list. He was activated on September 23 and optioned to Worcester. Araúz played in a total of 28 games for Boston, batting .185 (12-for-65) with three home runs and eight RBIs. He also appeared in 68 games for Worcester, batting .245 with six home runs and 30 RBIs.

Araúz made Boston's Opening Day roster in 2022, capturing one of the final reserve spots. He was placed on the COVID-related list on April 19. On May 12, he was removed from the COVID-related list and optioned to Worcester. Araúz was recalled by Boston on June 8, when Kiké Hernández was placed on the injured list. Araúz was then designated for assignment by Boston on June 10. In six games for Boston, he was hitless in 10 at bats. He also played in 24 games for Triple-A Worcester, batting .185 with three RBIs and no home runs.

Baltimore Orioles
On June 15, 2022, Araúz was claimed off of waivers by the Baltimore Orioles. He was then assigned to the Triple-A Norfolk Tides. He was designated for assignment on September 6, then assigned to Triple-A Norfolk three day later. In nine games with the Orioles, he batted .179 (5-for-28) with one home run and four RBIs. He also played in 11 games for Triple-A Norfolk, batting .250 (10-for-40), and three rehabilitation games in High-A, batting .100 (1-for-10).

New York Mets
On December 7, 2022, he was claimed by the New York Mets in the minor league phase of the Rule 5 draft.

International career
Araúz was selected to represent Panama at the 2023 World Baseball Classic qualification.

References

External links

1998 births
Living people
People from Chiriquí Province
Panamanian expatriate baseball players in the United States
Baltimore Orioles players
Boston Red Sox players
Major League Baseball players from Panama	
Major League Baseball second basemen
Major League Baseball shortstops
Major League  Baseball third basemen
Buies Creek Astros players
Corpus Christi Hooks players
Fayetteville Woodpeckers players
Greeneville Astros players
Florida Complex League Phillies players
Quad Cities River Bandits players
Tri-City ValleyCats players
Worcester Red Sox players
Norfolk Tides players
Aberdeen IronBirds players
2023 World Baseball Classic players